In Pakistan, a tehsil is an administrative sub-division of a District. Those are sub-divided into union councils. Here is a list of all the tehsils of Punjab Province.

Bahawalpur Division

Bahawalnagar District

 Bahawalnagar Tehsil
 Chishtian Tehsil
 Fort Abbas Tehsil
 Haroonabad Tehsil
 Minchinabad Tehsil

Bahawalpur District

 Ahmadpur East Tehsil
 Bahawalpur City Tehsil
 Bahawalpur Saddar Tehsil
 Hasilpur Tehsil
 Khairpur Tamewali Tehsil
 Yazman Tehsil

Rahim Yar Khan District

 Khanpur Tehsil
 Liaqatpur Tehsil
 Rahim Yar Khan Tehsil
 Sadiqabad Tehsil

Dera Ghazi Khan Division

Dera Ghazi Khan District

 Dera Ghazi Khan Tehsil
 De-Excluded Area D.G. Khan Tehsil
 Kot Chutta Tehsil

Jampur District

 Jampur Tehsil
 Muhammadpur Tehsil
 Dajal Tehsil
 Tribal Area Tehsil

Kot Addu District
 Kot Addu Tehsil
 Chowk Sarwar Shaheed Tehsil

Layyah District

 Chaubara Tehsil
 Karor Lal Esan Tehsil
 Layyah Tehsil

Muzaffargarh District

 Alipur Tehsil
 Jatoi Tehsil
 Muzaffargarh Tehsil

Rajanpur District

 Rajanpur Tehsil
 Rojhan Tehsil
 De-Excluded Area Rajanpur Tehsil

Taunsa District
 Taunsa Tehsil
 Koh-e-Suleman Tehsil
  Vehova Tehsil

Faisalabad Division

Chiniot District

 Bhawana Tehsil
 Chiniot Tehsil
 Lalian Tehsil

Faisalabad District

 Chak Jhumra Tehsil
 Faisalabad City Tehsil
 Faisalabad Sadar Tehsil
 Jaranwala Tehsil
 Samundri Tehsil
 Tandlianwala Tehsil

Jhang District
 Jhang Tehsil
 Shorkot Tehsil
 Ahmadpur Sial Tehsil
 Athara Hazari Tehsil
 Mandi Shah Jeewna  Announced but Notification not Issued Yet

Toba Tek Singh District
 Gojra Tehsil
 Kamalia Tehsil
 Pirmahal Tehsil
 Toba Tek Singh Tehsil

Gujrat Division

Gujrat District

 Gujrat Tehsil
 Kharian Tehsil
 Sarai Alamgir Tehsil
 Jalalpur Jattan Tehsil
 Kunjah Tehsil

Hafizabad District

 Hafizabad Tehsil
 Pindi Bhattian Tehsil

Mandi Bahauddin District

 Malakwal Tehsil
 Mandi Bahauddin Tehsil
 Phalia Tehsil

Wazirabad District
 Wazirabad Tehsil
 Ali Pur Chatta Tehsil

Gujranwala Division

Gujranwala District

 Gujranwala City Tehsil
 Gujranwala Saddar Tehsil
 Kamoke Tehsil
 Nowshera Virkan Tehsil

Narowal District

 Narowal Tehsil
 Shakargarh Tehsil
 Zafarwal Tehsil

Sialkot District

 Daska Tehsil
 Pasrur Tehsil
 Sambrial Tehsil
 Sialkot Tehsil

Lahore Division

Kasur District

 Chunian Tehsil
 Kasur Tehsil
 Kot Radha Kishan Tehsil
 Pattoki Tehsil

Lahore District

 Lahore Cantonment Tehsil
 Lahore City Tehsil
 Model Town Tehsil
 Raiwind Tehsil
 Shalimar Tehsil

Nankana Sahib District

 Nankana Sahib Tehsil
 Sangla Hill Tehsil
 Shah Kot Tehsil

Sheikhupura District

 Ferozewala Tehsil
 Muridke Tehsil
 Safdarabad Tehsil
 Sheikhupura Tehsil
 Sharak Pur Tehsil

Multan Division

Khanewal District

 Jahanian Tehsil
 Kabirwala Tehsil
 Khanewal Tehsil
 Mian Channu Tehsil

Lodhran District

 Dunyapur Tehsil
 Kahror Pacca Tehsil
 Lodhran Tehsil

Multan District

 Jalalpur Pirwala Tehsil
 Multan City Tehsil
 Multan Saddar Tehsil
 Shujabad Tehsil

Vehari District

 Burewala Tehsil
 Mailsi Tehsil
 Vehari Tehsil

Rawalpindi Division

Attock District

 Attock Tehsil
 Fateh Jang Tehsil
 Hassan Abdal Tehsil
 Hazro Tehsil
 Jand Tehsil
 Pindi Gheb Tehsil

Chakwal District

 Chakwal Tehsil
 Choa Saidan Shah Tehsil
 Kallar Kahar Tehsil

Jhelum District

 Dina Tehsil
 Jhelum Tehsil
 Pind Dadan Khan Tehsil
 Sohawa Tehsil

Rawalpindi District

 Rawalpindi Tehsil
 Gujar Khan Tehsil
 Kahuta Tehsil
 Kallar Syedan Tehsil
 Taxila Tehsil
 Kotli Sattian
 Daultala Tehsil

Murree District

 Kotli Sattian Tehsil
 Murree Tehsil

Talagang District
 Talagang Tehsil
 Lawa Tehsil

Sahiwal Division

Okara District

 Depalpur Tehsil
 Okara Tehsil
 Renala Khurd Tehsil

Pakpattan District

 Arifwala Tehsil
 Pakpattan Tehsil

Sahiwal District

 Chichawatni Tehsil
 Sahiwal Tehsil

Sargodha Division

Bhakkar District

 Bhakkar Tehsil
 Darya Khan Tehsil
 Kaloorkot Tehsil
 Mankera Tehsil

Khushab District

 Khushab Tehsil
 Noorpur Thal Tehsil
 Quaidabad Tehsil
 Naushera(Wadi-e-Soon) Tehsil

Mianwali District

 Isakhel Tehsil
 Mianwali Tehsil
 Piplan Tehsil

Sargodha District

 Bhalwal Tehsil
 Bhera Tehsil
 Kot Momin Tehsil
 Sahiwal Tehsil
 Sargodha Tehsil
 Shahpur Tehsil
 Sillanwali Tehsil

See also
 List of tehsils in Pakistan